Marie Kalergi (16 January 1840 – 11 March 1877) was a Polish noblewoman. Born in Saint Petersburg, she was the daughter of Jan Kalergi and the pianist Marie Nesselrode. Kalergi was married on June 27, 1857 in Paris to Franz Karl Coudenhove (1825-1893), founding the Coudenhove-Kalergi family. Their children were:

Heinrich Johann Marie Coudenhove-Kalergi (born 12 October 1859), founding the surname "Coudenhove-Kalergi" in 1903
Friedrich Coudenhove-Kalergi (born 9 January 1861)
Johann Dominik Maria Coudenhove-Kalergi (born 7 January 1863)
Maria Thekla Walburga Franzisca Coudenhove-Kalergi (born 31 May 1865)
Richard Joseph Franz Maria Coudenhove-Kalergi (born 8 May 1867)
Marietta Anna Sophie Viktorie Coudenhove-Kalergi (born 26 October 1874)

Marie Kalergi died, aged 37, at Ronsperg.

External links
http://patricus.info/Rodokmeny/Coudenhove.txt

1840 births
1877 deaths
19th-century Polish people
19th-century Polish women
Coudenhove-Kalergi family
Nobility from Saint Petersburg